Qeqqata is a municipality in western Greenland, operational from 1 January 2009. The municipality was named after its location in the central-western part of the country. Its population is 9,378 as of January 2020. The administrative center of the municipality is in Sisimiut (formerly called Holsteinsborg).

Creation
It consists of the previously unincorporated area of Kangerlussuaq, as well as two former municipalities of western Greenland, Maniitsoq and Sisimiut.

Geography 
In the south and east, the municipality is flanked by the Sermersooq municipality, although settlements and associated trade is concentrated mainly alongside the coast. In the north, it is bordered by the Qeqertalik municipality. The waters of the western coast are that of the Davis Strait, separating Greenland from Baffin Island. With an area of  it is the second-smallest municipality of Greenland after Kujalleq.

Politics
Qeqqata's municipal council consists of 15 members, elected every four years.

Municipal council

Administrative divisions

Maniitsoq area
 Maniitsoq (Sukkertoppen)
 Atammik
 Kangaamiut
 Napasoq

Sisimiut area
 Sisimiut (Holsteinsborg)
 Itilleq
 Kangerlussuaq (Søndrestrøm)
 Sarfannguit

Transport
Like all of Greenland, there are no roads between settlements. There are three airports in Qeqqata, Kangerlussuaq, Maniitsoq and Sisimiut, where Kangerlussuaq is the international hub for Greenland. Other settlements are served by boats.

A simple road for terrain vehicles between Kangerlussuaq and Sisimiut was approved in June 2020. It was finished all the way in September 2021.

See also 
 KANUKOKA

References

 
Davis Strait
Municipalities of Greenland
Populated places established in 2009